Ajay Kumar Bhalla is the current Home Secretary of India. He assumed the office on 23 August 2019, succeeding Rajiv Gauba. He is a senior IAS officer of 1984 batch,  from Assam Meghalaya cadre. He received three one-year extensions in August 2020, 2021, and 2022.

References 

Living people
Indian Administrative Service officers
Indian Home Secretaries
Year of birth missing (living people)